Fanny Schreck (born Franziska Ott; 11 June 1877 – 11 December 1951), also known as Fanny Schreck-Normann, was a German actress. She was married to actor Max Schreck. Both husband and wife acted in their most well-known film, Nosferatu, with Fanny Schreck uncredited as the nurse and Max Schreck as the vampire Count Orlok.

Selected filmography
Nosferatu (1922)
 The Trunks of Mr. O.F. (1931)
 Marriage Strike (1935)

References

External links

1877 births
1951 deaths
German stage actresses
German film actresses
German silent film actresses
20th-century German actresses